Transcendental Youth is the fourteenth studio album by the Mountain Goats. The album focuses on outcasts, recluses, the mentally ill, and others struggling in ordinary society. The album is loosely unified around a group of people living in Washington state. At least one character is confirmed to be recurring from All Hail West Texas, an earlier album.

Several songs were performed in concert with a capella quartet Anonymous 4 and featured arrangements by long-time friend Owen Pallett.  However, Anonymous 4 and Owen Pallett do not appear on the official studio album. This is the first Mountain Goats album to prominently feature a horn section, contributed and arranged by fellow musician Matthew E. White, who opened for the band on their 2012 tour.

The first 1,000 preorders of the album came with a bonus 7", containing demos for the songs "Steal Smoked Fish" on Side A, and "In the Shadow of the Western Hills," which was originally written for the album, on Side B.

Track listing 

First reported by John Darnielle on July 9, 2012, the track list is:

Personnel
John Darnielle – vocals, guitar, piano, lyrics, composition
 Peter Hughes – bass, backing vocals
 Jon Wurster – drums, percussion
Matthew E. White – horn arrangements
 Bob Miller – trumpet 
 Bryan Hooten – trombone 
 Reggie Chapman – bass trombone 
 John Licley – tenor saxophone, clarinet 
 Jason Scott – tenor saxophone, clarinet, flute 
 Phil Cook – piano on "The Diaz Brothers" 
Production
 Scott Solter – mixing, "electronics and atmosphere" 
 Brent Lambert – mastering, vocals on the song "Transcendental Youth"

References

The Mountain Goats albums
2012 albums
Albums produced by Brandon Eggleston
Merge Records albums